Leo Losert (31 October 1902 – 22 October 1982) was an Austrian rower who competed in the 1928 Summer Olympics.

In 1928 he was part of the Austrian boat, which won the bronze medal in the double sculls event with Viktor Flessl.

External links
 profile

1902 births
1982 deaths
Austrian male rowers
Olympic rowers of Austria
Rowers at the 1928 Summer Olympics
Olympic bronze medalists for Austria
Olympic medalists in rowing
Medalists at the 1928 Summer Olympics